Zandy's Bride is a 1974 American Western film directed by Jan Troell and starring Gene Hackman and Liv Ullmann.

The film is also known as For Better, for Worse in the United States (TV title). It was filmed on location near Big Sur, California.

Plot 
Zandy Allan is a hard-working cattle rancher in a remote part of the American West who needs a hired hand more than he needs a wife. He sends away for a mail-order bride, a Swedish woman who lives near Minneapolis. Expecting a woman in her 20s, Zandy is disappointed when Hannah Lund turns out to be 32. He is not interested in love, only in work, although this does not keep him from misbehaving around a local woman named Maria. Hannah is here, in his mind, strictly to help Zandy run his ranch and provide future sons. However, the more time he spends with Hannah, the less he comes to treat her as a possession that he has bought, in no small part because of her insistence that she be treated with respect.

Cast 
Gene Hackman as Zandy Allan
Liv Ullmann as Hannah Lund
Eileen Heckart as Ma Allan
Susan Tyrrell as Maria Cordova
Harry Dean Stanton as Songer
Joe Santos as Frank Gallo
Frank Cady as Pa Allan
Sam Bottoms as Mel Allan
Bob Simpson as Bill Pincus
Vivian Gordon as Street girl
Fabian Gregory Cordova as Indian boy

Production
Director Jan Troell recounted, "The first problem with me on Zandy's Bride was that I wasn't allowed to operate the camera [because of U.S. union rules]. That makes a lot of difference to me because I feel very awkward sitting beside the camera. Otherwise, I thought it was a very useful experience."

See also
 List of American films of 1974

References

External links

1974 films
1974 Western (genre) films
American Western (genre) films
1970s English-language films
Films based on American novels
Films directed by Jan Troell
1970s American films